The Toledo Redmen were an American basketball team based in Toledo, Ohio that was a member of the National Basketball League and the American Basketball League.

For the 1930/31 season, the team was known as the Toledo Red Men Tobaccos.

Year-by-year

Sports teams in Toledo, Ohio
Basketball teams in Ohio